Peter Murray Hautman (born September 29, 1952) is an American author best known for his novels for young adults. One of them, Godless, won the 2004 National Book Award for Young People's Literature. The National Book Foundation summary is, "A teenage boy decides to invent a new religion with a new god."

Biography
Hautman was born in Berkeley, California on September 29, 1952 and moved to St. Louis Park, Minnesota at the age of five. He graduated from St. Louis Park High School and attended the Minneapolis College of Art and Design and the University of Minnesota during the next seven years without receiving a degree from either institution. After working at several jobs for which he calls himself "ill-suited", Hautman's first novel, Drawing Dead, was published in 1993. He lives with novelist and poet Mary Logue in Golden Valley, Minnesota and Stockholm, Wisconsin.

Awards and honors
 Los Angeles Times Book Prize for Young Adult Literature, 2011, The Big Crunch
 National Book Award for Young People's Literature, 2004, Godless
 Minnesota Book Award for Mrs. Million (2000), Sweetblood (2004), Godless (2005) and Blank Confession (2011)
 Wisconsin Library Association Awards for Rag Man (2002) and Invisible (2006)
 Michigan Library Association "Thumbs Up" Award for Mr. Was (1997) and Rash (2007)
 Edgar Award for Best Juvenile for Otherwood (2018)

Books

Young-adult novels

Mr. Was (1996)
No Limit (1998)(Stone Cold)
Hole in the Sky (2000)
Sweetblood (2003)
Godless (2004) — winner, National Book Award
No Limit (2005)
Invisible (2005)
All-In (2007)
Full House (2007)
Rash (2006)
How to Steal a Car (2009)
Blank  Confession (2010)
The Big Crunch (2011)
What Boys Really Want (2012)
The Klaatu Diskos
The Obsidian Blade (2012)
The Cydonian Pyramid (2013)
The Klaatu Terminus (2014)
 Eden West (2015)

Adult novels

Drawing Dead (1993)
Short Money (1995)
The Mortal Nuts (1996)
Ring Game (1997)
Mrs. Million (1999)
Rag Man (2001)
Doohickey (2002)
The Prop (2006)

Middle-grade novels
The Bloodwater Mysteries (co-authored with Mary Logue)
Snatched (2006)
Skullduggery (2007)
Doppelganger (2008)
The Flinkwater Chronicles
The Flinkwater Factor (2015)
The Forgetting Machine (2016)
Slider (2017)
Otherwood (2018)

References

External links
 
 
Interview with Pete Hautman
Interview with Uma Krishnaswami
 
 Peter Murray at LC Authorities — with 88 records
 Interview with Pete Hautman, Mystery Book Reviewer Bruce Southworth interviews the author of DRAWING DEAD, NORTHERN LIGHTS Minnesota Author Interview TV Series #293 (1994)

1952 births
Living people
University of Minnesota alumni
American children's writers
American young adult novelists
National Book Award for Young People's Literature winners
American male novelists